Yea Football Club (colloquially known as The Tigers) is an Australian rules football club based in the Victorian town of Yea. The club competes in the Outer East Football Netball League.

History

The club was established in 1893 and initially competed in the North East Football Association, a competition that was centred around Seymour

In 1902 the Alexandra & Yea Football Association was founded with clubs from Alexandra, Thornton, Yarck and Yea competing. Yea won the inaugural premiership. 
In 1904 the club accepted a return to the NEFA and stayed until 1909. In an attempt to revive interest in the district Yea helped to reform the Alexandra & Yea FA in 1911 after the competition had been inoperative for some time.

In 1913 Yea played for one season in the King Parrot Creek Football Association, losing the Grand Final to Homewood 4.3.27 to 0.7.7.

In 1924 Yea moved on to the Waranga North East FL. This league functioned until the end of 1976, Yea won the last premiership.

In 1977 Yea played in the Yarra Valley Mountain District Football League until 1985.

In 1986 the club moved to the Kyabram & District Football League for twelve seasons.

In 1997 the Goulburn Valley Football League absorbed the clubs from the Tungamah Football League and had a second division for three years (1996–1998). These second division clubs then left to form the Central Goulburn Football League in 1998. At the end of 2005 Central Goulburn Football League ceased to exist and broke up and the teams went to other leagues.

Yea FC went to Kyabram & District Football League.

After two years Yea returned to the Yarra Valley Mountain District Football League.

Premierships
1896 North East FA
1902 Alexandra District FA
1912 Alexandra & Yea District FA
1919 Alexandra & Yea District FA
1920 Alexandra & Yea District FA
1945 (Upper Goulburn Football Association)
1946 (Upper Goulburn Football Association)
1950 (Waranga-North East Football League)
1968 (Waranga-North East Football League)
1976 (Waranga-North East Football League)
1982 Yarra Valley Mountain District Football League, 2nd Division)
1984 Yarra Valley Mountain District Football League, 2nd Division)
2000 Central Goulburn Football League
2003 Central Goulburn Football League
2005 Central Goulburn Football League

Losses (Came 2nd):

1947 (Waranga-North East FL)Seymour 16.26.122 def Yea 15.9.99
1995 Kyabram District Football League Ardmona 13.7.85 def Yea 9.15.69
2001 (Central Goulburn FL) Shepparton East 19.12.126 def Yea 10.10.70
2002 (Central Goulburn FL) Rumbalara 17.9.111 def Yea 16.9.105

VFL/AFL

 Ted Brown (Carlton)
 Vin Brown (Carlton)
 Matthew Dundas (Fitzroy, Richmond)
 Glenn Elliott (St Kilda, Melbourne)
 Robert Elliott (St Kilda, Melbourne)
 Jeff Hopgood (North Melbourne)
 Dick Ivey (North Melbourne)
 Eddie Jackson (Melbourne)
 Bernie McCarthy (North Melbourne)
 Gavan McCarthy (North Melbourne)
 Shane McCarthy (Geelong)
 John McLeish -

References

Australian rules football clubs in Victoria (Australia)
1893 establishments in Australia
Australian rules football clubs established in 1893
Shire of Murrindindi